East Pepperell is a census-designated place (CDP) in the town of Pepperell in Middlesex County, Massachusetts, United States. The population was 2,059 at the 2010 census.

History

Like the town of Pepperell, East Pepperell is named for Sir William Pepperrell, a Massachusetts colonial soldier who led the Siege of Louisbourg during King George's War.

Geography
East Pepperell is located at  (42.666956, -71.564063).

According to the United States Census Bureau, the CDP has a total area of 3.8 km (1.5 mi2). 3.7 km (1.4 mi2) of it is land and 0.1 km (0.04 mi2) of it (2.76%) is water.

Demographics

As of the census of 2000, there were 2,034 people, 714 households, and 566 families residing in the CDP. The population density was 557.0/km (1,437.7/mi2). There were 722 housing units at an average density of 197.7/km (510.3/mi2). The racial makeup of the CDP was 96.21% White, 0.84% African American, 0.20% Native American, 0.39% Asian, 0.69% from other races, and 1.67% from two or more races. Hispanic or Latino of any race were 1.18% of the population.

There were 714 households, out of which 43.4% had children under the age of 18 living with them, 58.5% were married couples living together, 17.4% had a female householder with no husband present, and 20.6% were non-families. 16.1% of all households were made up of individuals, and 4.1% had someone living alone who was 65 years of age or older. The average household size was 2.85 and the average family size was 3.18.

In the CDP, the age distribution of the population shows 29.7% under the age of 18, 8.6% from 18 to 24, 31.1% from 25 to 44, 23.4% from 45 to 64, and 7.2% who were 65 years of age or older. The median age was 34 years. For every 100 females, there were 95.8 males. For every 100 females age 18 and over, there were 90.0 males.

The median income for a household in the CDP was $55,272, and the median income for a family was $57,391. Males had a median income of $38,897 versus $31,129 for females. The per capita income for the CDP was $20,759. None of the families and 1.8% of the population were living below the poverty line, including no under eighteens and 25.6% of those over 64.

References

Census-designated places in Middlesex County, Massachusetts
Census-designated places in Massachusetts